Belfast Corporation Tramways formerly served the city of Belfast, Northern Ireland.

History
Belfast's first trams operated in 1872 and were horse-drawn. Initially, the system was owned and operated by the Belfast Street Tramways Company. It was purchased by the Belfast Corporation on 1 January 1905 and electrified, using overhead wires, in 1905.

Belfast's electric trams were originally painted red and white. Some older, unmodernised trams retained this livery until the 1950s. In 1928, a new general manager was appointed: William Chamberlain, formerly of Leeds Corporation Tramways. Chamberlain introduced a new livery of dark blue and white which remained the livery for all new trams from this point (This livery was also applied to the new Trolley buses in 1938, but later changed to red livery for these buses from late 1940s). He was also responsible for the modernisation of 50 of the older tramcars and the construction of 50 new vehicles.

Chamberlain was succeeded by Robert McCreary in 1931, who introduced a further fleet of 50 streamlined trams in 1935 – the last trams to be built for Belfast. These trams gained also the nickname "McCreary". Colonel McCreary retired in 1951 and was succeeded by Joseph Mackle.

Closure
Belfast Corporation converted the Falls Road tram service to trolleybuses in 1938. The Corporation regarded this as successful and a decision to eliminate the tram system was made in 1939. Trolleybuses continued to be introduced during the 1940s. The last trams ran in 1954 and, following a policy change, were replaced by diesel buses.

The trolleybuses were themselves replaced by diesel buses in 1968. The Belfast Corporation bus fleet was transferred to Citybus (now Metro) in 1973.

Preservation

Two ex-Belfast Corporation trams survive at the Ulster Folk and Transport Museum.
249 4-wheel double deck built 1905
357 4-wheel double deck built 1929
An older Belfast tram, of the horse-drawn variety, is also at the Ulster Folk Transport Museum. (No. 118)

Gallery

See also
Transport in Belfast
Transport in Ireland
National Tramway Museum
Ulster Folk and Transport Museum

Bibliography

References

1905 establishments in Ireland
1954 disestablishments in Northern Ireland
Tram transport in Northern Ireland
History of Belfast
Transport in Belfast
4 ft 9 in gauge railways in the United Kingdom